The 2006–07 Vancouver Canucks season was the Canucks' 37th NHL season.

Season overview
The season began on the heels of a blockbuster trade involving goaltender Roberto Luongo and Lukas Krajicek coming to Vancouver in exchange for Todd Bertuzzi, Alex Auld and Bryan Allen.  The acquisition of Luongo combined with the salary increases of the Sedin twins meant that the Canucks were too close to salary cap and as a result, saw names such as Ed Jovanovski, Anson Carter, Nolan Baumgartner, Jarkko Ruutu and Wade Brookbank lost to free agency.

In addition to the departures of high-profile players such as Bertuzzi, Jovanovski and Carter, general manager Dave Nonis had fired Marc Crawford as head coach after the 2005–06 season, and replaced him with Alain Vigneault.  The team also added players such as Jan Bulis, Taylor Pyatt, Marc Chouinard and Willie Mitchell, players who many thought are not as highly skilled as the ones who had recently departed.  Despite the arrival of Luongo, many hockey analysts and fans predicted before the season began that the team would either miss the playoffs, or at best battle for the last playoff spots as 7th or 8th seed in the Western Conference.  However, a few did foresee that the addition of a high-calibre goaltender in Luongo would propel the Canucks into the top three of the conference.

Under such skepticism, the team played mediocre hockey from October to the Christmas break, and received criticism due to the team's lack of scoring during this period.  However, after the Christmas break, the team had settled down on Vigneault's coaching system, and played stellar hockey from that point on, exceeding the expectations of fans, analysts and critics alike.  On April 7, 2007, the Canucks defeated the San Jose Sharks by a score of 4–3 in overtime to clinch the Northwest Division title; their second in the past three seasons.  Not only did the team win a division title, this season was known for many milestones, such as Taylor Pyatt setting career high in points, and Alain Vigneault setting a new franchise record for wins as a head coach.  Also, second-year player Kevin Bieksa had emerged as a top-four defenceman on the team throughout the season.

On January 9, 2007, the NHL announced that Roberto Luongo had been voted by the fans to start in goal in the 2007 All-Star Game in Dallas.  Aside from Luongo's selection into the All-Star Game, the first half of the season was also noted for the "Vote for Rory" internet campaign.  The campaign was aimed at getting defenceman Rory Fitzpatrick voted into the 2007 All-Star Game, while mocking the NHL system of internet voting which encouraged people to vote as many times as they liked.

For the first time in franchise history, the Canucks ended the regular season with the league's best penalty killing record, with an 86.9% efficiency.

With the division title and third seed in the conference, the Canucks faced off against the Dallas Stars in the Western Quarter-finals. The Canucks first game back in the playoffs was a long one. On April 11, 2007, the Canucks set a franchise record with a quadruple OT win in Game 1. The game was the longest in Canucks history and the sixth longest in league history. Also in this game the Canucks set a record for shots against, allowing 76. The Canucks won this seven-game series despite the fact that every Dallas victory was a shutout for goalie Marty Turco.

The goal scoring woes continued in the second round against Brian Burke's Anaheim Ducks and the Canucks could not score more than two goals in a game. Although Trevor Linden experienced a resurgence and tied for the team lead for scoring in the playoffs, the Sedin twins could not escape the Ducks' tight checking. The third period of Game 4 was a pivotal point as the Canucks could not protect a 2–0 third-period at home and lost in overtime. In the deciding Game 5 in Anaheim, call-up rookie Jannik Hansen attempted to move the puck from the Canucks' zone, but was caught by a thunderous hit by Rob Niedermayer. The puck then went to his brother Scott, right at the blue line, who fired a wrist shot on net. Roberto Luongo, engaged with a referee over whether the puck had cleared the zone, failed to track the puck, which ended up the back of the net and ended the Canucks' season.

Regular season

The Canucks finished the regular season with the League's best penalty-kill percentage, at 86.93%.

Schedule and results

October

Monthly Record: 7–5–1 (Home 2–2–0; Road 5–3–1)

November

Monthly record: 5–8–0 (home 4–4–0; road 1–4–0)

December

Monthly record: 8–5–0 (home 6–1–0; road 2–4–0)

January

Monthly record: 8–1–3 (home 4–1–2; road 4–0–1)

February

Monthly record: 8–3–1 (home 3–1–0; road 5–2–1)

March

Monthly record: 11–2–2 (home 6–1–2; road 5–1–0)

April

Monthly record: 2–2–0 (home 1–1–0; road 1–1–0)

 Green background indicates win.
 Red background indicates regulation loss.
 White background indicates overtime/shootout loss.

Playoffs
The Vancouver Canucks ended the 2006–07 regular season as the Western Conference's third seed.

Western Conference Quarter-finals: vs. (6) Dallas Stars
Vancouver wins series 4–3

Western Conference Semi-finals: vs. (2) Anaheim Ducks
Anaheim win series 4–1

Note:
 Green background indicates win
 Red background indicates loss

Player statistics

Skaters
Note: GP = Games played; G = Goals; A = Assists; Pts = Points; PIM = Penalty minutes

†Denotes player spent time with another team before joining Vancouver.  Stats reflect time with the Canucks only.

*Denotes player traded by Vancouver midway through the season. Stats reflect time with Canucks only.

Goaltenders
Note: GP = Games played; Min = Minutes; W = Wins; L = Losses; OT = Overtime/shootout losses; GA = Goals against; SO = Shutouts; Sv% = Save percentage; GAA = Goals against average

†Denotes player spent time with another team before joining Vancouver.  Stats reflect time with the Canucks only.

Awards and records

2007 Canuck Awards winners
 Molson Cup - Roberto Luongo
 Cyclone Taylor Trophy - Roberto Luongo
 Cyrus H. McLean Trophy - Daniel Sedin
 Babe Pratt Trophy - Kevin Bieksa
 Fred J. Hume Award - Kevin Bieksa
 Most Exciting Player Award - Roberto Luongo

Roberto Luongo
 Was voted in by the fans to represent the Western Conference at the 2007 All-Star Game in Dallas, as the starting goaltender on January 9, 2007.  In addition, Luongo won the goaltenders' competition at the All-Star Skills Competition by allowing the fewest goals-against for the In The Zone and Shootout events on January 23, 2007.
 Earned his 39th victory on March 9, 2007, at San Jose.  With the win, Luongo broke the franchise single-season win record of 38, which was set by Kirk McLean in the 1991–92 NHL season.
 Played in his 73rd game this season on March 31, 2007, vs. Calgary.  By playing that game Luongo broke the franchise single-season games played record, which was held by Gary Smith in the 1974–75 NHL season.
 Named on the NHL Second All-Star Team on June 14, 2007.
 Was the Monthly Award winner of the Mark Messier Leadership Award on March 21, 2007.
 Nominated for the Vezina Trophy, but lost to Martin Brodeur on June 14, 2007.
 Nominated for the Lester B. Pearson Award, but lost to Sidney Crosby on June 14, 2007.
 Nominated for the Hart Memorial Trophy, but lost to Sidney Crosby on June 14, 2007.

Daniel Sedin
 Played in his 400th career NHL and Canuck game on October 8, 2006, at Colorado.
 Registered his 100th career NHL and Canuck goal on January 13, 2007, at Toronto. With the goal, Sedin became the sixth most prolific scoring left winger in Canucks history with 237 points.
 Scored the OT game-winner on March 15, 2007, vs. St. Louis, tying an NHL record with his fourth this season.
 Got a goal and an assist on March 27, 2007, at Colorado, to register his 300th career NHL and Canuck point.

Henrik Sedin
 Recorded one assist on February 1, 2007, vs. Edmonton. With the assist, Sedin recorded his 200th career NHL and Canuck assist.
 Recorded three assists on March 25, 2007, vs. Colorado, to break the franchise single-season assists record with 63.  The previous record was 62, set by Andre Boudrias in the 1974–75 NHL season.
 Recorded two assists on April 3, 2007, vs. Los Angeles, to earn his 300th and 301st career NHL and Canuck points.
 Scored the game-winning goal in Game 1 vs. Dallas ending the longest overtime game in team history and the 6th longest in NHL history on April 11, 2007.  He was set up by his brother Daniel and Mattias Ohlund.

Trevor Linden
 Scored his 300th career goal as a Canuck on October 6, 2006, at Detroit.
 Got an assist, to earn his 400th career assist and his 700th career point as a Canuck on November 14, 2006, vs. Detroit.
 Played his 1,300th career NHL game on February 18, 2007, at Colorado.
 Scored his 12th goal on March 19, 2007, at Edmonton to record his 367th career NHL goal to surpass Jacques Lemaire (366) as the 97th all-time goal scorer in league history.

Markus Naslund
 Became the all-time franchise goal scoring leader with 301 goals on October 17, 2006, at Edmonton.
 Played his 900th career NHL game on December 8, 2006, vs. Carolina.
 Registered his 103rd power play goal as a Canuck to become the all-time franchise leader in power play goals on February 14, 2007, at Minnesota.

Brendan Morrison
 Earned his 400th career NHL point with an assist on October 13, 2006, vs. San Jose.
 On November 22, 2006, at Detroit, Morrison scored the overtime winner to become the franchise leader in overtime goals.
 Played his 600th career NHL game on January 18, 2007, at Ottawa.
 Sets a new franchise "Ironman" record playing his 483rd consecutive game on February 22, 2007, at Los Angeles, breaking the record that was previously held by Trevor Linden. On February 25, he became the NHL's active leader with 492 games. Finished the season with 512 consecutive games.

Alain Vigneault
 Recorded 36 wins as head coach of the Canucks on February 22, 2007, at Los Angeles.  With the win, Vigneault recorded the most wins by a Vancouver Canucks head coach during his first year behind the bench.
 On March 29, 2007, set a new franchise record for wins in a season with his 47th victory at Los Angeles. The record was previously held by coach Pat Quinn and was set in the 1992–93 NHL season.
 Won the Jack Adams Award for Coach of the Year on June 14, 2007.

Others
 Taylor Pyatt earned his 100th career NHL point on an even-strength goal on October 16, 2006, vs. Edmonton.
 Lukas Krajicek played in his 100th career NHL game on October 23, 2006, at Dallas.
 Sami Salo recorded his 100th career NHL point on November 11, 2006, vs. Calgary.
 Mattias Ohlund played in his 600th career NHL game as a Canuck game on January 5, 2007, vs. Edmonton.
 Matt Cooke earned his 100th career NHL point as a Canuck on an assist on February 14, 2007, at Minnesota.

Transactions

Trades

Free agents acquiredFree agents lost

Received from waiversPlaced on waivers

Draft picks
Vancouver's picks at the 2006 NHL Entry Draft in Vancouver, British Columbia.

Farm teams

Manitoba Moose
AHL affiliate that is based in Winnipeg, Manitoba and their home arena is the MTS Centre. The team has been affiliated with the Vancouver Canucks since the 2000–01 AHL season. In the 2006–07 AHL season, Manitoba finished in 1st place in the North Division, it was the franchises first regular season divisional championship in history.  In addition, Mike Keane won the Fred T. Hunt Memorial Award for Sportsmanship, Perseverance and overall dedication to hockey. In the playoffs, the Manitoba Moose defeated the Grand Rapids Griffins, 4 games to 3, in the first round.  However, Manitoba would eventually be eliminated by the Hamilton Bulldogs, 4 games to 2, in the second round of the playoffs.

Victoria Salmon Kings
ECHL affiliate that is based in Victoria, British Columbia and their home arena is the Save-On-Foods Memorial Centre. This is the first year that the franchise has been affiliated with the Vancouver Canucks in its three-year existence.  In the 2006–07 ECHL season, the Salmon Kings established their first winning record by going on a nine-game winning streak to end the regular season.  The Salmon Kings finished 7th overall in the National Conference and made their first playoff appearance against the Alaska Aces in the National Quarter-final.  The Salmon Kings would win Game 1 by a score of 3–2, however, the Aces would win 4 of the next 5 games to win the series 4–2, eliminating Salmon Kings from the playoffs.

External links
 Official website of the Vancouver Canucks

See also
 2006–07 NHL season

References

 Team standings: NHL standings on espn.com
 NHL standings on NHL.com

2006-07
2006–07 in Canadian ice hockey by team
2006–07 NHL season by team
2006 in British Columbia
2007 in British Columbia